The 2006 Gael Linn Cup, the most important representative competition for elite level participants in the women's team field sport of camogie, was won by Leinster, who defeated Munster in the final, played at Navan.

Arrangements
The 50th anniversary final was staged at Páirc Tailteann, venue for the first match of cmaogie and the revival inter-provincial series in 1956. Leinster defeated Munster by 2–7 to 1–8 with two late points. A free by Wexford’s Kate Kelly and injury-time point from Kilkenny's Áine Fahy clinched victory for Leinster. Munster, who had nine players from Cork's All-Ireland winning side, trailed 2-3 to 0-5 at half-time after Leinster struck goals by Brigid Curran and Marie Dargan. Munster's only goal came 19 minutes into the second half through substitute Clare’s Catherine O'Loughlin.

Gael Linn Trophy
A last-minute point from Veronica Curtin enabled Connacht defeat Ulster by a point 3–12 to 1–17, Ulster having led 1–13 to 2–4 at half time.

Final stages

|}

Junior Final

|}

References

External links
 Camogie Association

2006 in camogie
2006